Perry Louis Wiggins (born September 1, 1961) is a retired United States Army lieutenant general who served as commanding general, United States Army North. He assumed command in September 2013, having previously served as Deputy Commanding General. He is the son of a former senior noncommisioned officer and earned his commission as an Infantry lieutenant from Mercer University in 1983. Wiggins retired on September 30, 2016.

References

1961 births
United States Army personnel of the Gulf War
United States Army personnel of the Iraq War
Living people
Mercer University alumni
Recipients of the Defense Superior Service Medal
Recipients of the Distinguished Service Medal (US Army)
Recipients of the Legion of Merit
United States Army generals